Lainie Kazan (born Lainie Levine; May 15, 1940) is an American actress and singer. She was nominated for the Primetime Emmy Award for Outstanding Guest Actress in a Drama Series for St. Elsewhere and the 1993 Tony Award for Best Featured Actress in a Musical for My Favorite Year. She was nominated for a Golden Globe Award for her role in My Favorite Year (1982). Kazan played Maria Portokalos in My Big Fat Greek Wedding and its sequel film My Big Fat Greek Wedding 2. She also played Aunt Frida on The Nanny.

Early life
Kazan was born Lainie Levine in Brooklyn,  the daughter of Carole and Ben Levine. She is of Ashkenazi Jewish and Sephardic Jewish descent. Some of her grandparents lived in Israel   before moving to Manchester, England and settling in Brooklyn. Kazan has described her mother as "neurotic, fragile and artistic." Kazan attended Brooklyn's Erasmus Hall High School with Barbra Streisand, for whom she would later understudy. She graduated in 1956. Kazan studied theatre at HB Studio and graduated from Hofstra University in Hempstead, New York in 1960. While at Hofstra, Kazan appeared in school musicals written and directed by a classmate director Francis Ford Coppola as well as actor James Caan.

Career
Kazan made her Broadway debut in 1961 with the musical The Happiest Girl in the World. She appeared the following year in another musical, Bravo Giovanni, and understudied Barbra Streisand for the lead role of Fanny Brice in Funny Girl (1964). When Streisand could not perform due to a throat condition, Kazan took her place in a matinee and evening performance for one day of the show's run. Her popularity increasing, Kazan posed nude for the October 1970 issue of Playboy, which was reused in Pocket Playboy #4, issued in 1974. Her appearance in the magazine opened the door for her to headline and operate two different Playboy Jazz Clubs. Overseen by Hugh Hefner, the clubs were named Lainie's Room West and Lainie's Room East, each on opposite coasts, with the first one located in Los Angeles and the other in Manhattan. Her Playboy photographs inspired the look of Jack Kirby’s superheroine Big Barda.

Along with appearing in numerous supper clubs across the country, Kazan guest-starred on Dean Martin’s variety series 26 times. Other television work includes a recurring role as Aunt Frieda on the Fran Drescher sitcom The Nanny, the mother of Kirstie Alley's character on Veronica's Closet, and various guest roles, including one on St. Elsewhere that resulted in an Emmy nomination. Her other television work has included The Paper Chase, Columbo, Touched by an Angel, and Will & Grace.

Kazan played Maria Portokalos, the mother of Toula Portokalos (Nia Vardalos) in the films My Big Fat Greek Wedding and My Big Fat Greek Wedding 2. Following the first film in the franchise, Kazan was featured in My Big Fat Greek Life, a short-lived series based on the film. Other recent film work includes the mother of Adam Sandler’s character in I Now Pronounce You Chuck and Larry. Although the scene was deleted in the feature film, it is included on the DVD in the special features section. Kazan appeared as singer Ava St. Clair with Kevin James in two episodes of The King of Queens.

A life member of The Actors Studio, Kazan returned to Broadway to recreate her film role for the musical adaptation of My Favorite Year, earning a Tony Award nomination for her performance. She completed a stint in The Vagina Monologues. She has appeared in regional productions of A Little Night Music, Man of La Mancha, Gypsy, Who's Afraid of Virginia Woolf?, Hello, Dolly!, and Fiddler on the Roof. In 1984, she made a guest appearance on the Faerie Tale Theatre episode “Pinocchio” as Sophia the Blue Fairy.

In the Ugly Betty episode "Fire and Nice," Kazan played Dina Talercio, the mother of Bobby (Adam Rodriguez), who becomes the character's brother-in-law. In 2010, Kazan joined the cast of Desperate Housewives for season 7. She played the role of Mrs. Maxine Rosen, a self-employed business owner and neighbor to Susan Delfino.

Personal life
After meeting musical director-arranger Peter H.B. Daniels on the Broadway musical Funny Girl, in which Kazan was a cast member and he was associate orchestra conductor, the two began a five-year relationship. They married sometime after the 1971 birth of their daughter Jennifer. The marriage did not endure, and Kazan was single again by 1976.

In the 1970s, Kazan was diagnosed with a deep vein thrombosis (DVT). Since then, she has dedicated time to public education about DVT. 

Beginning in 2012, Kazan became an adjunct professor at UCLA, teaching acting classes and directing her students in drama-department production. She has served on the boards of the Young Musicians’ Foundation, AIDS Project LA, and B'nai Brith, the California Jazz Foundation, and her alma mater, Hofstra University.

On April 9, 2016, Kazan was injured in a head-on traffic collision. Kazan was driving her car when the collision occurred in Sherman Oaks, California, which necessitated that she be hospitalized.

In December 2017, outside a California supermarket, Kazan was arrested for shoplifting. Prosecutors reached a plea deal with her.

Filmography

Film

Television

Stage work

Leave It to Jane (1959, Off-Broadway)
Kittiwake Island (1960, Off-Broadway)
The Happiest Girl in the World (1961, Broadway)
Bravo Giovanni (1962, Broadway)
Funny Girl (1964, Broadway, understudy for Barbra Streisand)
Man of La Mancha (1972, Westbury Music Fair)
Seesaw (1973, Broadway, replaced by Michele Lee before the opening)
Show Boat (1979, U.S. tour)
Gypsy (1992, Westbury Music Fair)
My Favorite Year (1992, Broadway)
The Government Inspector (1994, Broadway)
Rags (2006, World AIDS Day benefit concert)
Bermuda Avenue Triangle (2006, Los Angeles)

Discography 
 Lainie Kazan (1966) SE-4385 MGM Records (original studio album)
 Right Now (1966) SE-4340 MGM Records (original studio album; with sleeve notes by Dean Martin)
 Love Is Lainie (1967) SE-4496 MGM Records (original studio album)
 The Love Album (1967) SE 4451 MGM Records (original studio album)
 The Best of Lainie Kazan (1969) SE-4631 MGM Records (compilation album)
 The Chanteuse is Loose (1977) LK515 Lainie & Co. (original studio album)
 Body & Soul (1995) 65126 MusicMasters (original studio album)
 In the Groove (1998) 65168 MusicMasters (original studio album)

As guest vocalist
With Benny Carter
Benny Carter Songbook Volume II (MusicMasters, 1997)

References

External links

1940 births
Actresses from New York City
American film actresses
American musical theatre actresses
American television actresses
American voice actresses
Erasmus Hall High School alumni
Hofstra University alumni
Jewish American actresses
Jewish American musicians
Lee Strasberg Theatre and Film Institute alumni
Living people
MGM Records artists
Musicians from Brooklyn
Singers from New York City
Torch singers
20th-century American actresses
20th-century American singers
21st-century American actresses
21st-century American singers
20th-century American women singers
21st-century American women singers
UCLA School of Theater, Film and Television faculty
Pompeii Records artists
21st-century American Jews